The German Open (known for sponsorship reasons as the Bull's German Open) is a darts tournament that began in 1986. It was abandoned for three years before being recurred in 1990 where it has been held annually. All tournaments was held in Germany at various venues. The first winners of the tournament was Bernd Hebecker from Germany and Mia Mevissen from Netherlands.

Tournament was not organized in 2020–2022 due to coronavirus pandemic.

List of tournaments

Men's

Women's

Boys

Girls

Tournament records
 Most wins 3:  Gary Anderson
 Most Finals 4:  Martin Adams. 
 Most Semi Finals 6:  Martin Adams.
 Most Quarter Finals 8:  Martin Adams.
 Most Appearances 13:  Martin Adams.
 Most Prize Money won  €6289.85:  Gary Anderson.
 Best winning average (96.60) :  Gary Anderson v  Michael van Gerwen, SF, 2016.
 Youngest Winner age 18:   Benito van de Pas. 
 Oldest Winner age 51:  Darryl Fitton.

References

External links

1977 establishments in Germany
Darts tournaments
Sports competitions in Germany